The Garretson Outlet Bridge is a historic structure located north of Whiting, Iowa, United States. The Iowa Bridge Company of Des Moines held the bridge contract for Monona County when this bridge was built. They fabricated and erected the Warren pony truss with polygonal upper chords in 1913. Around the same time they had constructed other several small- and medium-scale bridges over a system of channelized streams and drainage ditches that had recently been completed across the county. This bridge was listed on the National Register of Historic Places in 1999.

References

Bridges completed in 1913
Truss bridges in Iowa
Bridges in Monona County, Iowa
National Register of Historic Places in Monona County, Iowa
Road bridges on the National Register of Historic Places in Iowa
Warren truss bridges in the United States